is the ninth compilation album by Japanese singer Shizuka Kudo. It was released on March 15, 2000, through Pony Canyon. It is Kudo's second single collection: the album features all of Kudo's singles released from "Kindan no Telepathy" (1987) up to her most recent at the time, "Blue Zone" (1999), as well as all five singles released by Ushirogami Hikaretai. The album was released digitally on May 28, 2014, however only the four singles missing from the subsequently released compilation Shizuka Kudo Best were made available for download.

Background
The album was released without Kudo's consent, after she had already left Pony Canyon. According to Kudo, she only came to know of the compilation's existence when she stumbled onto it when flipping through the CD racks of a convenience store.

Commercial performance
Millennium Best debuted at number 25 on the Oricon Albums Chart, with 18,000 units sold. The album charted in the top 100 for a total of five consecutive weeks, selling a reported 36,000 copies during its chart run.

Track listing

Charts

References

External links
 Millennium Best on Pony Canyon's official website

2000 compilation albums
Shizuka Kudo albums
Pony Canyon compilation albums